The Elizabeth Leach Gallery is a contemporary art gallery in Portland, Oregon's Pearl District that specializes in artists from the Pacific Northwest, although Leach shows other artists. It was established in 1981 by Elizabeth Leach, who is considered a trailblazer in the Portland gallery scene, and is directed by Daniel Peabody and Leach's daughter, Gwendolyn Schrader-Leach.

Leach is the daughter of Palm Beach billionaire Howard H. Leach, former US Ambassador to France under George W. Bush.

References

External links

1981 establishments in Oregon
Art galleries established in 1981
Art museums and galleries in Oregon
Pearl District, Portland, Oregon